Currence is a Dutch association set up the banks that coordinates the payment systems in the Netherlands. Its aim is to "facilitate and provide market transparency while maintaining the quality and safety of the payment systems of the Netherlands." Currence's CEO is Piet Mallekoote.

History
Currence was founded on 1 January 2005 through an initiative by eight Dutch banks (ABN AMRO, Rabobank, ING Groep, Fortis, SNS Bank, BNG, Friesland Bank and Van Lanschot Kempen).  It was originally known as Brands & Licences Betalingsverkeer Nederland B.V. during its development stage and was renamed as Currence from the 17 May 2005.

Aims and responsibilities
It is responsible for coordinating payment methods and facilitating cooperation between payment providers by providing standards and transparency while maintaining the quality and safety of the payment systems in the Netherlands.

It attempts to do this by setting clearly defined standards for all parties wishing to use the Currence payment products, PIN, Chipknip, Acceptgiro, Incasso/Machtigen and iDEAL, are able to operate.  To create a level playing field it sets clear rules and regulations relating to product use and the product environment and regulates and supervises participants.

References

External links
 

Payment systems organizations
Financial services in the Netherlands
Banking organizations
2005 establishments in the Netherlands